Luria isabella, common names Isabel's cowry, Isabella cowry or fawn-coloured cowry, is a species of sea snail, a cowry, a marine gastropod mollusk in the family Cypraeidae, the cowries.

Description
The basic color of these cylindrical-shaped shells is light beige or fawn or pale reddish-brown, the dorsum surface is crossed by thin discontinuous longitudinal markings and the extremities show orange-red terminal spots. The base is mainly white and the long and narrow aperture has several short teeth. In the living cowries the well developed mantle is black matt and almost velvety, with external short antennae.

Distribution
This species lives in the Red Sea, along the East African coast, the Mascarene Basin and in the Indo-West Pacific Ocean (Malaysia, Indonesia, Australia, Melanesia, Philippines, Southern Japan, Taiwan) up to Hawaii.

Habitat
During the day they usually stay under rocks and stones or in small holes or coral caves. At dawn or dusk they start feeding on sponges, algae or coral polyps.

Subspecies
There have been a great many subspecies named, but most names are very dubious. However the following are generally accepted as valid names:
Luria isabella isabella (Linnaeus, 1758)
Luria isabella controversa (Gray, 1824) (sometimes accepted as Luria controversa)
Luria isabella gilvella  Lorenz, 1999
Luria isabella mexicana  Stearns, 1893

References

 Verdcourt, B. (1954). The cowries of the East African Coast (Kenya, Tanganyika, Zanzibar and Pemba). Journal of the East Africa Natural History Society 22(4) 96: 129-144, 17 pls.

External links 
 On-line articles with Cypraea isabella in the HAWAIIAN SHELL NEWS (1960-1994)
 Biolib
 Underwater
 
 Clade

Cypraeidae
Gastropods described in 1758
Taxa named by Carl Linnaeus